Ahmadi (احمدی) is a common surname. It may refer to the following:

Ahmad Ahmadi, Iranian nurse
Ahmad Ahmadi (philosopher)
Ahmad Ahmadi (sailor)
Ahmadreza Ahmadi
Latif Ahmadi
Masoud Ahmadi Moghaddasi
Noushin Ahmadi Khorasani
Rahman Ahmadi
Sirous Ahmadi, Australian-Iranian lawyer and writer
Shiva Ahmadi, Iranian American artist
Yousef Ahmadi
Zahra Ahmadi

Arabic-language surnames
Iranian-language surnames
Patronymic surnames
Surnames from given names